Andrei Sergeyevich Pazin (born 20 January 1986) is a Russian professional football player. He plays for FC Kolomna.

Club career
He made his Russian Premier League debut for FC Mordovia Saransk on 27 July 2012 in a game against FC Kuban Krasnodar.

External links
 

1986 births
Sportspeople from Bryansk
Living people
Russian footballers
Russia youth international footballers
Association football midfielders
FC Krasnodar players
FC Mordovia Saransk players
FC Tosno players
FC Lokomotiv Moscow players
FC Dynamo Bryansk players
FC Lukhovitsy players
FC Nosta Novotroitsk players
Russian Premier League players
Russian First League players
Russian Second League players